Horacio Serpa Uribe (4 January 1943 – 31 October 2020) was a Colombian lawyer, politician and Senator. Serpa ran as the Colombian Liberal Party candidate for President  on three occasions; in 1998, 2002, and 2006. He previously served as congressman for Santander as Senator, Inspector General of Colombia, president of the National Constituent Assembly, Minister of the Interior, and as Ambassador to the Organization of American States. He was also involved in the 8000 process scandal in which money from the Cali Cartel entered the presidential campaign of Liberal candidate Ernesto Samper. In 2007 Serpa ran for the governorship of Santander Department and was elected on 28 October in the regional elections.

Political career
Horacio Serpa worked in three branches of government in Colombia. After graduating as a lawyer from the Universidad del Atlántico in Barranquilla, Serpa went back to his native Santander Department and became a judge for the town of Tona. He later became a Penal Judge in the town of San Vicente de Chucurí and then Civil Municipal Judge in Barrancabermeja. In Barrancabermeja Serpa also served as Criminal Investigator, Circuit Penal Judge and Superior Judge. During this time Serpa became interested in politics and began participating actively in the Liberal Revolutionary Movement (MRL) as member of the youths, this movement had been founded by Alfonso López Michelsen.

Serpa concentrated his political efforts in the Magdalena medio (Middle Magdalena Region), a convulsed region in which the ELN guerrilla was born. In 1970 Serpa was appointed Mayor of Barrancabermeja by Alfonso Gómez Gómez and later became Secretary of Education for the Santander Department.

In the legislative branch Serpa served as councilman for the town of Barrancabermeja and later as National Chamber of Representatives member representing Santander Department as replacement for congressman Rogelio Ayala in 1974. Serpa was re-elected for the periods of 1978 and 1982 under a movement founded by him, the Authentic Liberal Leftist Front (Frente de Izquierda Liberal Auténtico, FILA) aligned with the official Liberal party.

In the Chamber of Representatives, Serpa became President of the Accusations Commission and President of the Congress of the Republic Plan Commission. In 1985 Serpa ran for the senate and was elected. In 1998 Serpa was appointed Inspector General of Colombia. He also served as Minister of Government, Minister of Interior, Presidential Peace Advisor and Ministry Delegate in Presidential Functions during the Liberal presidencies of Virgilio Barco (1986–1990) and Ernesto Samper (1994–1998).

Serpa was later elected to the National Constituent Assembly in 1991 in which he shared a collegiate presidency with Antonio Navarro Wolff (former member of the M-19 guerrillas) and Álvaro Gómez Hurtado (representative of the Conservative Party) to create the Colombian Constitution of 1991.

After the creation of the new constitution Serpa continued as President of Liberal Directorate in Santander Department and President of the Central Politics Commission of the Liberal Party. He was then prospect for presidential candidate in 1998, but was shaded by Ernesto Samper. Serpa was then elected National Director of the Liberal party for the period 1998 to 1999. During the government of Álvaro Uribe, Serpa was appointed ambassador of Colombia to the Organization of American States (OAS) and he also disputed the presidential bids of 2002 and 2006.

8000 Process involvement

In 1981 Serpa met Ernesto Samper Pizano, who was working as debate chief of Alfonso López Michelsen's second presidential campaign and became good friends. For the presidential campaign of 1990 Samper became a candidate and Serpa collaborated with his efforts in the Santander Department, his region of influence, while being the leader of his movement: the FILA. But Samper lost the elections.

In the 1994 elections, Serpa became Debate Chief of Samper's presidential campaign and this time Samper was elected president of Colombia. On 20 June 1994, the opposing presidential candidate Andrés Pastrana then made public the Narcocassettes a series of telephone recordings in which members of the Cali drug cartel mainly journalist Alberto Giraldo talked with Gilberto and Miguel Rodríguez Orejuela regarding the financing of the Samper campaign for the presidency.

The Supreme Court then opened an investigation which was dubbed the Proceso 8000. Serpa defended Samper against these allegations of drug money entering the campaign in which he was also involved. The relations with the United States government a major contributor to the drug effort in Colombia deteriorated. Samper and most of his collaborators were absolved from any wrongdoing with the exception of Fernando Botero and Santiago Medina. But the scandal involved a dozen members of Congress and numerous politicians and businessmen with the Cali cartel. After this incident Serpa's credibility maintained a low level with Colombians for supporting Samper, as well as responding to criticism with aggravating words.

Peace negotiator
During his time as congressman, Serpa was always assisting and representing the government in conflicts between worker unions, social conflicts and the government mainly in the Santander Department where he had his political niche. Serpa has always been in favor of a peacefully negotiated solution. During the government of Belisario Betancur, Serpa was invited to be a negotiator between the ELN guerrillas and was part of numerous peace commissions that never achieved successful results.

During the government of Virgilio Barco, Serpa was appointed Minister of Government in which he collaborated in setting a demobilization timetable for the EPL, the PRT and the Quintín Lame Movement. In 1992 under the government of César Gaviria Serpa led the failed negotiation attempts with the ELN guerrillas in Tlaxcala, Mexico.

During the government of Samper, Serpa intended to negotiate with the FARC guerrillas. The group asked for the demilitarization of La Uribe, Meta, a region in central Colombia, but were unsuccessful. Serpa opposed the CONVIVIR groups created by Fernando Botero, a group of self-defense groups intended to improve security in areas were the government couldn't reach. Despite his opposition the plan of the CONVIVIR was approved. He then traveled to Bonn, Germany, where the Colombian government and local government of Bonn were again trying to negotiate with the ELN guerrillas, but these peace talks also failed.

Presidential campaign results for Serpa

1998
First round
 Horacio Serpa U. (Vice: María Emma Mejía):    3,647,007 (34.64%)
 Andrés Pastrana (Vice: Gustavo Bell):     3,613,278 (34.32%)
 
Second round
 Andrés Pastrana:    6,086,507  (50.39%)
 Horacio Serpa:          5,620,719  (46.53%)

2002
 Álvaro Uribe (Vice: Francisco Santos Calderón): 5.862.655 (53.048%)
 Horacio Serpa: (Vice: José Gregorio Hernández Galindo):   3.514.779 (31.803%)

This election was won by Álvaro Uribe by a majority vote of half plus one vote, which according to the 1991 Constitution made a secondary election unnecessary. After these negative results for his political career Serpa said that he would never run for the presidency ever again. A few years later he changed his position and after quitting his post as ambassador to the Organization of American States (OAS), he decided to run again for the presidency. In 2005 he was appointed vice-president of the Socialist International.

2006
On 12 March 2006 Serpa was selected as candidate for the Colombian Liberal Party for the presidency of Colombia.

 Álvaro Uribe (Vice president: Francisco Santos): 7,397,835 (62.35%)
Carlos Gaviria (Vice president: Patricia Lara): 2,613,157 (22.02%)
 Horacio Serpa: (Vice president :Luis Iván Marulanda Gómez): 1,404,235 (11.83%)

Candidate for Governor of Santander 
On 28 October 2007 Serpa was elected Governor of the Department of Santander by popular vote in the regional elections. He took office on 1 January 2008.

See also
Ernesto Samper
8000 Process
Cali Cartel

References

External links
 Presidential campaign 2002

1943 births
2020 deaths
Candidates for President of Colombia
20th-century Colombian judges
Colombian Liberal Party politicians
Colombian Ministers of Government
Colombian Ministers of the Interior
Colombian political scientists
Academic staff of the Free University of Colombia
Governors of Santander Department
Inspectors General of Colombia
Mayors of places in Colombia
Members of the Chamber of Representatives of Colombia
Members of the Constituent Assembly of Colombia
Members of the Senate of Colombia
People from Bucaramanga
Permanent Representatives of Colombia to the Organization of American States
Deaths from the COVID-19 pandemic in Colombia
University of Atlántico alumni